Sinocyclocheilus rhinocerous is a species of ray-finned fish in the genus Sinocyclocheilus.

References 

rhinocerous
Fish described in 1994